Brenda Benet (born Brenda Ann Nelson; August 14, 1945 – April 7, 1982) was an American actress. She is best known for her roles on the soap operas The Young Marrieds (1965–1965) and Days of Our Lives (1979–1982). She was also featured in an episode of Hogan's Heroes in 1970.

Early life and career
Benet was born Brenda Ann Nelson in Hollywood, Los Angeles, California; later, her family moved to South Gate. She graduated from South Gate High School, attended Los Angeles City College, then studied at the University of California at Los Angeles, majoring in languages. She studied with San Francisco Ballet, was featured in several productions of the Los Angeles Civic Light Opera, was a musician who played piano, flute and violin, and was fluent in five languages.

Her first acting roles were in 1964, with appearances on Shindig! and The Young Marrieds. She eventually became an actress very much in demand for roles in episodic primetime television in the 1960s and 1970s, including I Dream of Jeannie; McHale's Navy; Daniel Boone; Mannix; My Three Sons; Hogan's Heroes; Love, American Style; Wonder Woman; The Love Boat and The Courtship of Eddie's Father. She also had a major role in the feature film Walking Tall (1973).

Although many of the characters she portrayed seemed to be either sweet or seductive, she became perhaps best known for her role as scheming villainess Lee Dumonde on the daytime serial Days of Our Lives, a role she played from 1979 until her death in 1982.

Personal life
Her first marriage was to The Donna Reed Show actor Paul Petersen in 1967. In 1969, Benet left Petersen for actor Bill Bixby. After her divorce from Petersen became final, she married Bixby in 1971. The couple had a child, Christopher Sean, in September 1974, and then divorced in 1980. After the divorce and  until her death, Benet was in a relationship with future pundit Tammy Bruce.

Benet experienced a number of personal and professional challenges after her divorce from Bixby. Her role on Days of Our Lives made her extremely unpopular with fans; Benet's character was breaking up one of the show's popular couples, Doug and Julie, and fans were outraged.  However, Benet's most personal challenge occurred when her six-year-old son Christopher died in March 1981. While they were on a weekend ski trip at Mammoth Lakes, Christopher suffered acute epiglottitis, going into a coma and cardiac arrest after doctors subsequently carried out a tracheotomy.

Death
Benet was devastated by her son's death and sank into a severe depression. On April 7, 1982, she died of a self-inflicted gunshot wound at her home in Los Angeles. She was 36. In her book The Death of Right and Wrong, talk radio host Tammy Bruce writes of her personal involvement with Bixby and Benet. Benet and Bruce were romantically involved for a time, and Benet killed herself in a home she had previously shared with Bruce. Bruce had moved out two weeks prior to the suicide. On the day of Benet's suicide, Bruce thought that she would be meeting her for lunch.    According to Bruce, Benet was locked inside the bathroom of her home when she arrived. Bruce sensed something was wrong and went to get help. After Bruce stepped outside, Benet shot herself.

Filmography

References

External links 
  

1945 births
1982 deaths
20th-century American actresses
Actresses from Los Angeles
American film actresses
American soap opera actresses
American television actresses
Bisexual actresses
LGBT people from California
LGBT-related suicides
University of California, Los Angeles alumni
Suicides by firearm in California
1982 suicides
Female suicides
20th-century American LGBT people
American bisexual actors